is a 1992 Japanese film directed by Yōichi Higashi based on the novel by Sue Sumii.

Cast
Naoko Otani as Fude Hatanaka
Tamao Nakamura as Nui Hatanaka
Tetta Sugimoto as Seitaro Hatanaka
Masato Hagiwara as Sadao Shimura
Etsushi Takahashi as Iseda
Saki Takaoka as Nanae Minemura

Awards and nominations
17th Hochi Film Award
 Won: Best Director - Yōichi Higashi

References

External links
 

1992 films
Films directed by Yōichi Higashi
1990s Japanese-language films
1990s Japanese films

ja:橋のない川#映画版